George Guess may refer to:

 Sequoyah (c. 1770–1843), Cherokee silversmith, named in English George Gist or George Guess
 George W. Guess (1822–1868), mayor of Dallas, Texas, 1866–1868